The Golden Eagle Award for Best Original Score (Russian: Золотой Орёл за лучшую музыку к фильму) is one of twenty award categories presented annually by the National Academy of Motion Pictures Arts and Sciences of Russia. It is one of the Golden Eagle Awards, which were conceived by Nikita Mikhalkov as a counterweight to the Nika Award established in 1987 by the Russian Academy of Cinema Arts and Sciences.

Each year the members of the academy choose three nominees to award the best film composer and the film as a perception. The first composer to be awarded was Alexey Rybnikov for the film The Star. The most recent award was made to Yuri Poteyenko for Doctor Lisa. Eduard Artemyev and Poteyenko hold the record for the most wins, with five each. Other people with multiple nominations include Alexey Rybnikov (with one win out of three nominations) and Aleksey Aygi (with one win out of four nominations).

Nomineess and awardees
Key

References

External links
 

Original Score
Lists of films by award